Aston Villa had a disappointing 1890–91, their 3rd season, having finished ninth. They also had a poor season in the F.A. Cup going out in the second round against Stoke. As consolation Aston Villa won the 1890 National League of Baseball of Great Britain and  remain National Baseball champions.

Aston Villa, now known exclusively as a football club, won the only professional baseball championship in 1890. The competition was hindered by poor weather and disappointing crowds and made a loss for its investors. Aston Villa's win was not without controversy, however, with both Aston Villa and Preston North End being found guilty of cheating during the season. For much of the season Derby Baseball Club did lead the championship, however, pressure from other teams in the league over the number of American players on the Derby team and low attendances led to Derby being expelled before the end of the season, though at the time the club insisted they had ‘retired’ as champions, despite evidence to the contrary.

Results

League
The table below lists all the results of Aston Villa in the Football League for the 1890–91 season

FA Cup

1st Round, 17 January 1891, London Casuals, Home, Won 13–1
2nd Round, 31 January 1891, Stoke, Away, Lost 0–3

References

External links
avfchistory.co.uk 1890–91 season

Aston Villa F.C. seasons
Aston Villa